Sphenophorus destructor is a species of beetle in the family Dryophthoridae. It is found in North America.

References

Further reading

 
 

Dryophthorinae
Articles created by Qbugbot
Beetles described in 1905